Philpott Lake is a reservoir in the U.S. state of Virginia. It is impounded by Philpott Dam.

Philpott Lake extends into Franklin, Henry, and Patrick counties, Virginia.

The lake and Philpott Dam were created to control flooding along the Smith River, to generate hydroelectric power, and to provide recreational activities. Construction on Philpott Dam began in 1948 and was completed in 1952.

See also
Fairy Stone State Park
Fairystone Farms Wildlife Management Area

References

External links
 U.S. Army Corps of Engineers: Philpott Lake

Reservoirs in Virginia
Protected areas of Franklin County, Virginia
Protected areas of Henry County, Virginia
Protected areas of Patrick County, Virginia
Tourist attractions in Franklin County, Virginia
Tourist attractions in Henry County, Virginia
Tourist attractions in Patrick County, Virginia
Bodies of water of Franklin County, Virginia
Bodies of water of Henry County, Virginia
Bodies of water of Patrick County, Virginia